Wee Tian Siak (26 April 1921 – 29 July 2004) was a Chinese born Singaporean basketball player. He competed in the men's tournament at the 1948 Summer Olympics, representing China, and at the 1956 Summer Olympics, representing Singapore.

Wee studied in Ai Tong Primary and Chung Cheng High.

In 1952, Wee was selected by Taiwan for the 1952 Summer Olympics. Due to the Cross-Strait relations between Taiwan and China, Taiwan did not compete in the end and hence, Wee did not participate.

References

External links
 

1921 births
2004 deaths
Chinese men's basketball players
Singaporean men's basketball players
Olympic basketball players of China
Olympic basketball players of Singapore
Basketball players at the 1948 Summer Olympics
Basketball players at the 1956 Summer Olympics
Singaporean sportspeople of Chinese descent
Place of birth missing
Republic of China men's national basketball team players